Dropbox or drop box may refer to:

 Dropbox, a web-based file hosting service
 Drop box, or post box, a physical box for collection of outgoing mail
 Drop box (audio engineering), a device used to connect microphones to a multicore cable
 Drop box (stage lighting), a device used to connect multiple lights to one power source
 Drop box (weaving device), a device invented by Robert Kay for improved working of weaving looms
 The Drop Box, 2014 documentary film
 Dropbox (band), an American rock band
 Dropbox (album), their 2004 album